Boris: The Rise of Boris Johnson (2006) is a biography of Boris Johnson by Andrew Gimson, which discusses why Boris Johnson joined politics and became an MP. An updated edition was later published in 2008 after Johnson was elected Mayor of London.

2006 non-fiction books
British biographies
2006 in British politics
Biographies about politicians
Books about British politicians
Boris Johnson